Pia Filler (née Blaeser - born 7 June 1998) is a German professional pool player from Stolberg, Germany. Pia is married to 2018 WPA World Nine-ball Championship winner Joshua Filler. Filler is a German national champion on 11 occasions.

Filler has also been successful on the Euro Tour, reaching the semi-final of the 2018 Portugal Open. She would lose 7–3 to Marharyta Fefilava in the semi-final.

Titles
 2022 Euro Tour Treviso Open 
 2022 European Pool Championship 8-Ball

References

External links

German pool players
Female pool players
People from Stolberg (Rhineland)
Sportspeople from Cologne (region)
1998 births
Living people
20th-century German women
21st-century German women